Okop (Bulgarian: Окоп) - a village in South-Eastern Bulgaria in the Yambol Province, in the Tundzha Municipality. According to the National Institute of Statistics, in the year of 2016, the village had 599 inhabitants. The Holy Assembly Council takes place on 24 May.

References

Villages in Yambol Province